The Uutaalnganu people, also known as Night Island Kawadji, are an Aboriginal Australian group of Cape York Peninsula in northern Queensland. The name is also used collectively for several peoples in this area, such as the Pontunj / Jangkonj (Yanganyu), whose language is unconfirmed.

Name
Kawadji formerly referred to a people who inhabited Night Island and the coastal strip opposite. It now refers primarily to a modern aggregation of six peoples, collectively known by the same ethnonym kawadji which means "people of the sandbeach" (pama malnkana). These groups, the Umpithamu/Koko Ompindamo, Pakadji, Yintyingka, Otati, Umpila and Pontunj are the traditional owners and users of the coastal areas east of the Great Dividing Range of northeastern Cape York from Oxford Bay to Princess Charlotte Bay.

History
The traditional Kawadji of Night Island were a small population and intermarried with clans of the mainland Barungguan.

The Night Island Kawadji were known for their skill in building and then employing double-outrigger wooden canoes (tango) in adventurous voyages to outlying reefs where they would hunt for dugong, turtles, and the eggs of both sea birds and turtles.

Narcisse Pelletier survived a shipwreck of a French merchantman Saint Paul in 1858, when he was abandoned by the crew. He was taken in by the Kawadji/Pama Malngkana, with linguistic and other evidence pointing to the area of the  Uutaalnganu. He stayed with them for 17 years.

Language

The Night Island Kawadji spoke, according to Norman Tindale, Yankonyu, a dialect of the Umpila language spoken by the Umpila and Pontunj, to whom they were closely related.

Native title

The landmark ruling was delivered by Justice Debra Mortimer of the Federal Court of Australia, sitting at the Supreme Court of Queensland in Cairns.

Alternative names
The following alternative names refer to the original people of Night Island:
 Kawadji (This term was also an exonym used by the Kaantju and other tribes within the interior, bearing the general sense of 'east' (kawai)
 Night Island people

Names of other peoples also called 'Kawadji' -
 Mälnkänidji ( formed from malqkan (beach) and (-idja (a suffix meaning 'belonging to')
 Jangkonju (a name for their language, shared by the Pontunj)
 Yankonyu

Notes

Citations

Sources

Aboriginal peoples of Queensland